In number theory, the second Hardy–Littlewood conjecture concerns the number of primes in intervals. Along with the first Hardy–Littlewood conjecture, the second Hardy–Littlewood conjecture was proposed by G. H. Hardy and John Edensor Littlewood in 1923.

Statement
The conjecture states that

for integers , where  denotes the prime-counting function, giving the number of prime numbers up to and including .

Connection to the first Hardy–Littlewood conjecture
For example, an admissible k-tuple (or prime constellation) of 447 primes can be found in an interval of  integers, while .

References

External links
 
 

Analytic number theory
Conjectures about prime numbers
Unsolved problems in number theory